Beatriz de Lisocky (born 23 February 1946) is a Colombian sailor. She competed in the 470 event at the 1976 Summer Olympics.

References

External links
 

1946 births
Living people
Colombian female sailors (sport)
Olympic sailors of Colombia
Sailors at the 1976 Summer Olympics – 470
Place of birth missing (living people)